Equality is a village in Gallatin County, Illinois, United States. The population was 595 at the 2010 census, down from 721 at the 2000 census. Near the village are two points of interest, the Crenshaw House and the Garden of the Gods Wilderness. Equality was the county seat of Gallatin County from 1826–1851.

History
On Jan. 26, 1826, Equality was officially established by the General Assembly as the county seat of Gallatin County. The courthouse was built in 1827 for the amount of $1,300.00 dollars. Court was held there until 1851, when all legal documents were removed to Shawneetown, The building was later used as a school, church & local society meetings. It was destroyed by fire Nov. 28, 1894.

Salt Works
French settlers extracted salt near Equality as early as 1735, while Native Americans made salt here long before then. In 1803, the American Indians ceded their "Great Salt Springs" to the US government by treaty. The government then leased the springs, requiring the holder to produce a certain quantity of salt each year or pay a penalty. The salt works is referred to as the "United States Saline" in old documents.

Isaac White was in charge of the salt works in 1811. White volunteered for the Indiana Militia that year, and was killed at the Battle of Tippecanoe.

Special territorial laws permitted exceptions to anti-slavery treaties at these salines, and slaves were used extensively in manufacturing salt. The census of 1820 for Gallatin County listed 239 slaves or servants.

During the 1820s, Gallatin County included what is now Saline County as its western half. In 1826, the county seat was moved from Old Shawneetown, on the eastern edge of the county, to the new village of Equality, near the center of what was then Gallatin County. Equality remained the county seat until the formation of Saline County in 1847.

In 1838, a local salt maker and illegal slave trader kidnapper and illegal slave breeder, John Hart Crenshaw, began building his manor house at Hickory Hill just five miles east of Equality; he used the house for his business of kidnapping free blacks and breeding slaves to sell into slavery as part of the Reverse Underground Railroad.

The Great Salt Springs are located southeast of Equality, on federal land along the south bank of the Saline River, seven-tenths of a mile west of Illinois Route 1 on Salt Well Road. Half Moon Lick, where the saltworks first developed as a large industry, is on private property southwest of Equality.

Geography
Equality is located in western Gallatin County at  (37.736472, -88.344473), on the north side of the Saline River, a southeast-flowing tributary of the Ohio River.

Demographics

As of the 2000 United States Census, there were 721 people, 315 households, and 206 families residing in the village. The racial makeup of the village was 99.17% White, 0.14% from other races, and 0.69% from two or more races. Hispanic or Latino of any race were 1.66% of the population.

There were 315 households, out of which 29.8% had children under the age of 18 living with them, 50.5% were married couples living together, 11.4% had a female householder with no husband present, and 34.6% were non-families. 32.4% of all households were made up of individuals, and 18.4% had someone living alone who was 65 years of age or older.  The average household size was 2.29 and the average family size was 2.90.

In the village, the population was spread out, with 24.3% under the age of 18, 6.1% from 18 to 24, 26.4% from 25 to 44, 25.5% from 45 to 64, and 17.8% who were 65 years of age or older.  The median age was 40 years. For every 100 females there were 94.9 males.  For every 100 females age 18 and over, there were 83.8 males.

The median income for a household in the village was $22,171, and the median income for a family was $27,625. Males had a median income of $26,250 versus $18,214 for females. The per capita income for the village was $12,961.  About 14.0% of families and 20.7% of the population were below the poverty line, including 21.4% of those under age 18 and 22.3% of those age 65 or over.

Further reading
 1887. History of Gallatin, Saline, Hamilton, Franklin and Williamson Counties, Illinois. Chicago: Goodspeed Publishing Co.
 1903 The Salines of Southern Illinois by Professor George W Smith
 Musgrave, Jon, ed. 2002. Handbook of Old Gallatin County and Southeastern Illinois. Marion, Ill.: IllinoisHistory.com. 464 pages.
 Musgrave, Jon. 2004, Rev. ed. 2005. Slaves, Salt, Sex & Mr. Crenshaw: The Real Story of the Old Slave House and America's Reverse Underground R.R.. Marion, Ill.: IllinoisHistory.com. 705 pages.

References

 Stu Fliege. 2002. Trails & Tales of Illinois. Chicago: University of Illinois Press.
 Jon Musgrave. 2005. Slaves, Salt, Sex & Mr. Crenshaw. Marion, Ill.: IllinoisHistory.com.
 Gillum Ferguson. 2007. The Perilous Infancy of Saline County, Journal of Illinois History, Vol. 10, p. 49.

External links
 Equality
 Illinois History
 Prairie Ghosts
 Stace England & The Salt Kings concept Music CD on "The Old Slave House"
 Glen O. Jones Lake
 Equality Masonic Lodge

Villages in Gallatin County, Illinois
Populated places established in 1735